The Arlberg Road Tunnel, with a length of , is Austria's longest road tunnel. When it was inaugurated, it was the longest road tunnel in the world. It carries the S16 Arlberg Schnellstraße (German for "Arlberg Highway") under the Arlberg massif from Tyrol to Vorarlberg.

It was built between July 1974 and December 1978, and its costs amounted to 4 billion Austrian schillings (~300 million €). The tunnel is designed for 1800 vehicles per hour and equipped with 4 ventilation centres (one shaft with a height of 736 metres is the deepest in Europe), 12 vents, 43 cameras for traffic monitoring and 16 niches. In 1998 the tunnel was used by 2.6 million vehicles, where 18% are accounting for freight transport. The Arlberg Tunnel is a Toll Road with a one-way fee of €11 (as of October 2019). Tolls for both directions are collected at the eastern end of the tunnel.

See also
Arlberg Railway Tunnel

References

Road tunnels in Austria
Tunnels completed in 1978
Tunnels in the Alps
1978 establishments in Austria
20th-century architecture in Austria